Rohan Bopanna and Jeevan Nedunchezhiyan were the defending champions, but lost in the quarterfinals to Pierre-Hugues Herbert and Gilles Simon.

Robin Haase and Matwé Middelkoop won the title, defeating Herbert and Simon in the final, 7–6(7–5), 7–6(7–5).

Seeds

Draw

Draw

References
 Main Draw

Doubles